Secret Window is a 2004 American psychological thriller film starring Johnny Depp and John Turturro. It was written and directed by David Koepp, based on the novella Secret Window, Secret Garden by Stephen King, featuring a musical score by Philip Glass and Geoff Zanelli. The story appeared in King's 1990 collection Four Past Midnight. The film was released on March 12, 2004, by Columbia Pictures; it was a moderate box office success and received mixed reviews from critics.

Plot
After catching his wife Amy having an affair with their friend Ted, mystery writer Mort Rainey retreats to his cabin at Tashmore Lake in upstate New York, while Amy stays in their marital home. Six months later, Mort, depressed and suffering from writer's block, has delayed finalizing the divorce.

One day, a man named John Shooter arrives at the cabin and accuses Mort of plagiarizing his short story, "Sowing Season". Upon reading Shooter's manuscript, Mort discovers it is virtually identical to his own story, "Secret Window", except for the ending. The following day, Mort, who once plagiarized another author's story, tells Shooter that his story was published in a mystery magazine two years before Shooter's, invalidating his plagiarism claim. Shooter demands proof and warns Mort against contacting the police. That night, Mort's dog, Chico, is found dead outside the cabin, along with a note from Shooter giving Mort three days to provide proof.

Mort reports the incident to Sheriff Newsome. Mort drives to his and Amy's house intending to retrieve a copy of the magazine but leaves because Ted and Amy are there. Mort instead hires private investigator Ken Karsch, who stakes out the cabin and speaks to Tom Greenleaf, a local resident who may have seen Shooter and Mort talking together. At the cabin, Shooter appears and demands that Mort revise his story's ending to Shooter's version, where the protagonist kills his wife. When an arson fire destroys Amy and Mort's house, and presumably the magazine, Mort reveals to the police that he has an enemy.

Karsch tells Mort that he suspects Shooter has threatened Greenleaf after Greenleaf claimed he never saw Mort and Shooter talking together. Mort and Karsch agree to confront Shooter but first choose to meet up with Greenleaf at the local diner the next morning. Arriving late, Mort discovers that neither Karsch nor Greenleaf showed up at the diner. On his way back, Mort encounters Ted at a gas station where Ted demands Mort sign the divorce papers. Believing Shooter is in Ted's employ, Mort refuses, taunts Ted, and leaves.

Later, Shooter summons Mort to a meeting place; when he arrives, Mort finds Karsch and Greenleaf dead inside Greenleaf's truck and passes out at the sight. When he recovers Shooter tells Mort he killed the two men because they had "interfered" in his business, and warns Mort he has deliberately implicated him in the two men's murders (having used Mort's axe and screwdriver as the murder weapons) and implies Mort should dispose of the bodies. Mort agrees to meet Shooter at his cabin to show him the magazine containing his story, which is supposed to arrive that day, having been sent overnight by his literary agent. Mort later retrieves his tools and then pushes Greenleaf's truck with both bodies still in it off a steep cliff into a water-filled quarry where it sinks.

Mort retrieves the package containing the magazine from the post office but finds that it has already been opened with the pages containing his story ripped out. At Mort's cabin, Mort sees Shooter's hat and puts it on and begins speaking to himself, trying to make sense of the events. Frustrated and in denial, Mort throws an object at the wall and is surprised to see a growing crack fracture the cabin in half. Looking in the mirror, he's startled to see the back of his head reflected instead. Mort realizes that Shooter is a figment of his imagination, a character brought to life through Mort's undetected dissociative identity disorder, unwittingly created to cope and carry out malevolent tasks that Mort cannot do - like killing Chico, Greenleaf and Karsch, as well as burning down their home. That persona now takes full control of Mort.

Amy arrives at the cabin, finding it ransacked and sees the word "SHOOTER" carved repeatedly on the walls and furniture. Mort appears, speaking and acting as Shooter, wearing his hat. Amy realizes the name "Shooter" represents Mort's desire to "SHOOT HER". He chases Amy and stabs her in the ankle. Ted, looking for Amy, arrives and is ambushed by Mort, who smashes his face with a shovel. Amy watches helplessly as Mort bludgeons Ted with the shovel, while reciting the ending of "Sowing Season". He then murders Amy offscreen.

Months later, Mort has recovered from his writer's block and his passion for life returns. He is feared and shunned in town because of the rumors about the missing people associated with him. Sheriff Newsome arrives and tells Mort that he is the prime suspect in the supposed murders. He warns him that the bodies will eventually be found and he will be caught, then says he is no longer welcome in town. Mort passively dismisses the threat and tells Newsome that the ending to his new story is "perfect". It is implied that Amy and Ted's bodies are buried under the corn growing in Mort's garden, allowing Mort to slowly destroy any evidence of their murders. (In an alternative ending cut for home media their bodies are shown under the earth.)

Cast
Johnny Depp as Morton "Mort" Rainey
John Turturro as John Shooter
Maria Bello as Amy Rainey
Timothy Hutton as Ted "Teddy" Milner
Len Cariou as Sheriff Dave Newsome
Charles S. Dutton as Private Investigator Ken Karsch
John Dunn Hill as Tom Greenleaf

Production
Part of Secret Window was filmed in the town of North Hatley, Quebec in the Eastern Townships approximately two hours south east of Montreal. Other filming locations included Lake Massawippi, Lake Sacacomie, Lake Gale and the village of Bromont, Quebec.

According to director David Koepp on the DVD commentary track, the footage of the ocean scene during Mort's restless night on the couch was extra b-roll footage taken from The Lost World: Jurassic Park.

The film's ending is different from the source novella's. In the novella, Ted and Amy survive Mort's attempt on their lives, and Mort dies. It is also revealed that through supernatural forces, the fictional John Shooter had manifested and come to life from Mort's imagination, and really was the one to commit the murders and arson.

Reception
Roger Ebert awarded Secret Window three stars out of a possible four, stating that it "could add up to a straight-faced thriller about things that go boo in the night, but Johnny Depp and director David Koepp ... have too much style to let that happen." He continues by noting that the "story is more entertaining as it rolls along than it is when it gets to the finish line. But at least King uses his imagination right up to the end, and spares us the obligatory violent showdown that a lesser storyteller would have settled for." Ian Nathan from Empire only awarded the film 2 stars out of a possible 5, stating that "The presence of the sublime Depp will be enough to get Secret Window noticed, but even his latest set of rattling eccentricities is not enough to energise this deadbeat parlour trick."

On Rotten Tomatoes, Secret Window has an approval rating of 46% based on 163 reviews, with an average rating of 5.50/10. The site's critics' consensus reads: "Depp is quirkily entertaining, but the movie runs out of steam by the end." On Metacritic, the film has an aggregated score of 46 out of 100 based on 34 critics, indicating "Mixed or average reviews". Audiences polled by CinemaScore gave the film an average grade of "C+" on an A+ to F scale.

The film was a modest box office success, succeeding at recouping its budget of $40 million with a worldwide gross of $92.9 million.

An alternate ending was included on the home media release, explicitly showing both Ted and Amy's dead bodies underneath the corn patch in Mort's garden. In the final version of the film, it is implied, but the bodies are not shown.

See also

List of films featuring mental illness

References

External links

 
 
 
 
 

2004 films
2004 horror films
2004 psychological thriller films
2000s English-language films
2000s horror thriller films
2000s mystery thriller films
2000s psychological horror films
Adultery in films
American horror thriller films
American mystery thriller films
American psychological horror films
American psychological thriller films
Columbia Pictures films
Fiction with unreliable narrators
Films about dissociative identity disorder
Films about writers
Films based on American horror novels
Films based on works by Stephen King
Films directed by David Koepp
Films scored by Philip Glass
Films scored by Geoff Zanelli
Films set in New York (state)
Films shot in Quebec
Films with screenplays by David Koepp
Uxoricide in fiction
2000s American films